In computing, a physical address (also real address, or binary address), is a memory address that is represented in the form of a binary number on the address bus circuitry in order to enable the data bus to access a particular storage cell of main memory, or a register of memory-mapped I/O device.

Use by central processing unit
In a computer supporting virtual memory, the term physical address is used mostly to differentiate from a virtual address.  In particular, in computers utilizing a memory management unit (MMU) to translate memory addresses, the virtual and physical addresses refer to an address before and after translation performed by the MMU, respectively.

Unaligned addressing
Depending upon its underlying computer architecture, the performance of a computer may be hindered by unaligned access to memory.  For example, a 16-bit computer with a 16-bit memory data bus, such as Intel 8086, generally has less overhead if the access is aligned to an even address. In that case fetching one 16-bit value requires a single memory read operation, a single transfer over a data bus.

If the 16-bit data value starts at an odd address, the processor may need to perform two memory read cycles to load the value into it, i.e. one for the low address (throwing away half of it) and then a second read cycle to load the high address (throwing away again half of the retrieved data).  On some processors, such as the Motorola 68000 and Motorola 68010 processors, and SPARC processors, unaligned memory accesses will result in an exception being raised (usually resulting in a software exception, such as POSIX's SIGBUS, being raised).

Use by other devices

The direct memory access (DMA) feature allows other devices in the mother board besides the CPU to address the main memory.  Such devices, therefore, also need to have a knowledge of physical addresses.

See also
 Address constant
 Addressing mode
 Address space
 Page address register
 Pointer (computer programming)
 Primary storage, also known as main memory
 Virtual memory
 Virtual address, also known as logical address
 Page table
 Memory management unit (MMU)
 Gray code addressing

References

Computer memory
Virtual memory
Data types